The 2022 Big East women's basketball tournament is the postseason women’s  basketball tournament for the Big East Conference and took place March 4 to 7, 2022, at Mohegan Sun Arena in Uncasville, Connecticut. UConn won their 20th title, receiving the conference's automatic bid to the 2022 NCAA tournament.

Seeds 
All 11 Big East schools are scheduled to participated in the tournament. Teams will be seeded by the conference record with tie-breaking procedures to determine the seeds for teams with identical conference records. The top five teams will receive first-round byes. Seeding for the tournament will be determined at the close of the regular conference season.

Schedule

Bracket

References 

Tournament
Big East women's basketball tournament
College basketball tournaments in Connecticut
Sports competitions in Uncasville, Connecticut
2022 in sports in Connecticut
Big East women's basketball tournament
2020s in Connecticut
Women's sports in Connecticut